Inglemire is a suburb of Kingston upon Hull, in the East Riding of Yorkshire, England.

Inglemire has a library, a leisure centre, 2 post offices 6 places of worship and a few schools.

References
Philip's Street Atlas (pages 139–140)

Wards and districts of Kingston upon Hull